Borghild Hammerich (2 March 1901 – 8 September 1978) was a Norwegian activist most known for her humanitarian efforts during World War II.

Biography
Borghild Schmidt was born in Bergen, Norway. She was the daughter of Lauritz Peter Schmidt (1873-1946) and Petra Marie Mortensen (1873-1958). In 1921, she was married to Danish naval officer Carl Hammerich (1888–1945). The couple resided in Copenhagen where he served as an admiral in the Royal Danish Navy.

This humanitarian effort had been founded on Carl Hammerich's initiative in March 1942. Borghild Hammerich devoted much  of her energy and time to Danskehjelp. She also organized shipment of food packs to Norwegian prisoners in German concentration camps.

Carl Hammerich also continued his participation in the relief work and was arrested by German officials late in the war. He died when the Royal Air Force bombed the Gestapo building in Copenhagen on 21 March 1945 (Operation Carthage). 
.

After the liberation of Denmark and Norway at the end of World War II, Borghild Hammerich  served as Secretary-General  of the Danish-Norwegian Cooperation Fund (Fondet for dansk-norsk samarbeid). 
She  married  pianist and music professor Robert Riefling (1911-1988) in 1949.

For her humanitarian efforts, Borghild Hammerich was awarded an Honorary Doctorate Degree (Doctores philosophiae) from the University of Oslo on September 3, 1945. She was also decorated that same year Commander with Star of the Royal Norwegian Order of St. Olav.

References

Other sources
Mürer, Niels Jørgen (1947) Boken om Danskehjelpen (Oslo : Gyldendal Norsk Forlag)

External links
Fondet for dansk-norsk samarbeid website

1901 births
1978 deaths
People from Bergen
Norwegian emigrants to Denmark
Norwegian women in World War II
Norwegian humanitarians
Women nonprofit executives
Recipients of the St. Olav's Medal
Burials at the Cemetery of Our Saviour